Since 1954, Kazakhstan has developed many  gauge lines, in six individual networks with a total length of approximately 1150 km.

Overview
 Atbasar network, 255 km
 Kokchetav network, 305 km, operational since 1954, partly regauged to Russian gauge. 
 Kustanay, 143 km, opened in 1953.
 Utjak to Peski-Celinnie line, 264 km
 Novo-Uritskoje – Kovilnaja, 94 km, opened in 1957.
 Bulaevo line, approximately 99 km long, opened in 1957, closed in 1989.
 Kotrbulak Acisaj line via Ujik, Kokkija and Sergo, 47 km industrial railway operated by the metallurgical combine Acpolimetall in Kentau, closed in 1980.

Children's railways
Kazakhstan has several children's (pioneers) railways located in or near cities.

Alma-Ata Children's Railway, 1.2 km long circular railway opened in 1952.
Arkaluk Children's Railway, almost nothing is known about this railway. Opened approximately 1986 and closed in 1993.
Astana Children's Railway, opened in 1946 and closed in 2002.
Atbasar Children's Railway, opened in November 1979 and has been closed and dismantled between 1991 and 1996.
Shymkent Children's Railway, 6 km long, opened in 1980.
Karaganda Children's Railway, 5.1 km long, opened on 1 May 1957.
Kokchetav Children's Railway, opened in 1984 and closed in 1995.
Kustanaj Children's Railway, 3 km and opened on 7 October 1978,closed in 1999.
Kurort-Borovoe Children's Railway, opened in 1979 and closed in 1998/1999.
Pavlodar Children's Railway, opened in 1979 and closed in 2008.
Semipalatinsk Children's Railway, 1–2 km long circular railway, opened in 1981 and closed in 1989.

References